The Chief of Materiel (COM) is a senior Indian Navy appointment in the rank of Vice-Admiral. As a Principal Staff Officer (PSO) at Naval Headquarters (NHQ), the COM is responsible for all aspects of maintenance management and life-cycle support of all engineering, electrical, electronic, weapons, sensors, and IT-related systems for ships and submarines, along with responsibility for the creation of major marine and technical infrastructure. The present COM is Vice-Admiral Sandeep Naithani, who succeeded Vice-Admiral S. R. Sarma on 1 June 2021.

History
In 1949, the Naval headquarters was reorganised and appointment of Chief of Material (COM) was created.  The appointment was held by an officer of the rank of Captain. The COM was to look after the material resources of the service. The Director of Naval engineering, Staff Officer (Dockyard), Director Armament Supply and the Director of Electrical Engineering reported into the COM.

The appointment was filled by the Chief of Administration as an additional charge until the early 1950s. Captain Daya Shankar, DSC was the first Indian to serve as the COM full-time.

Organisation
The COM heads the Materiel Branch at the Naval Headquarters. The following Directors General/Controllers/Assistant Principal Staff Officers report into the COM. 
 Controller of Logistics
 Assistant Controller of Logistics
 Assistant Chief of Materiel (Nuclear System Maintenance)
 Assistant Chief of Materiel (Information Technology & Systems)
 Assistant Chief of Materiel (Dockyard & Refit)
 Assistant Chief of Materiel (Modernisation)

Appointees

Notes

References

Indian military appointments
Indian Navy appointments